Maximum Priest E.P. is a 1999 EP by Squarepusher, released on Warp Records. It features remixes by Autechre and Luke Vibert.

Track listing
"Song: Our Underwater Torch" – 6:23
"Decathlon Oxide" – 4:05
"You're Going Down" – 3:35
"Cranium Oxide" – 0:32
"Two Bass Hit" (ae Mix) – 4:01
"Circular Flexing" (Yee-King Mix) – 5:36
"Shin Triad" (Wagonchrist Mix) – 4:15

References

External links
Maximum Priest E.P. at the official Warp Records website

1999 EPs
Squarepusher EPs
Warp (record label) EPs